Kian Schaffer-Baker (born April 28, 1998) is a professional Canadian football wide receiver for the Saskatchewan Roughriders of the Canadian Football League (CFL).

University career 
Schaffer-Baker played U Sports football for the Guelph Gryphons from 2016 to 2019. In the 2019 East–West Bowl, he led all players with five catches for 126 yards and a touchdown. He finished his university career with 28 games played, recording 95 receptions for 1,544 yards, and eight touchdowns.

Professional career 
Despite recording good testing numbers in the 2020 Ontario Regional Combine, Schaffer-Baker was not invited to the CFL Combine that year for the top ranked players available in the 2020 CFL Draft. He was then drafted in the fourth round, 30th overall, by the Saskatchewan Roughriders. However, he did not play in 2020 due to the cancellation of the 2020 CFL season. Instead, it was announced that he had signed his rookie contract with the Roughriders on January 19, 2021.

Following 2021 training camp, Schaffer-Baker began the 2021 season on the Roughriders' practice roster. After an injury to Shaq Evans in week 2, Schaffer-Baker was elevated to the active roster and made his CFL debut against the Ottawa Redblacks on August 21, 2021 where he had four catches for 64 yards. In his fourth game, he scored his first professional touchdown on September 17, 2021 against the Toronto Argonauts after catching a pass from Cody Fajardo and running 24 yards to the endzone for the score. He finished his rookie season with 47 receptions for 563 yards with two touchdowns. Schaffer-Baker continued his strong play into his second season, playing in all 18 regular season games and totaling 68 receptions for 960 yards with five touchdowns. He was named the Roughriders nominee for Most Outstanding Canadian. 

Following the 2022 season Schaffer-Baker had workouts with the Jacksonville Jaguars and Pittsburgh Steelers of the NFL.

References

External links 
Saskatchewan Roughriders bio

1998 births
Living people
Canadian football wide receivers
Guelph Gryphons football players
Players of Canadian football from Ontario
Saskatchewan Roughriders players
Sportspeople from Mississauga